Linda de Jong is a former New Zealand rower.

At the 1989 World Rowing Championships at Bled, Yugoslavia, she won silver in the lightweight women's double sculls as stroke, partnering with Philippa Baker.

References

New Zealand female rowers
Year of birth missing (living people)
Living people
World Rowing Championships medalists for New Zealand
20th-century New Zealand women